Senator Gregg may refer to:

Andrew Gregg (1755–1835), U.S. Senator from Pennsylvania from 1807 to 1813
Judd Gregg (born 1947), U.S. Senator from New Hampshire from  1993 to 2011